Crystal Blaze was a Finnish metal band.

Biography
The band was formed in 1995 and started first playing power metal under the name Guardian Force. Over the years, the group has gone through changes and the band started to take its current form in 2001, when Lari Sorvo (keyboards) and Lauri Koskenniemi (guitar) joined the founding members Mikael Grönroos (guitar), Max Obstbaum (vocals) and Gustaf Standertskjöld (drums) with the bassist Eerik Purdon. Now that the band performs and records under the name Crystal Blaze, the musical genre has also changed. The group is not afraid of combining different styles and genres with metal. Crystal Blaze's first demo Dreams was published in 2004 and was recorded at the MusaMuusa studios. The second demo The Punishment was released in 2006. In 2007, Crystal Blaze parted ways with one of the founding members of the band, drummer Gustaf Standertskjöld. Crystal Blaze was the winner of 2007 Wacken Metal Battle Finland and also performed at Wacken Open Air 2007 festival in Germany. In March 2008, the band released its third release named Beneath the Sands. At the same time the band also announced Juhana Karlsson as a new drummer. The band was split up in 2010.

Band members
Max Obstbaum - vocals
Mikael Grönroos - guitar
Lauri Koskenniemi - guitar
Eerik Purdon - bass
Lari Sorvo - keyboards
Juhana Karlsson - drums

Discography
Dreams (2004)
The Punishment (2006)
Beneath the Sands (2008)

External links
Crystal Blaze @ Mikseri
Crystal Blaze @ MySpace

Finnish power metal musical groups